is a private university at Nakamura-ku, Nagoya, Aichi Prefecture, Japan. The school was founded as a junior college in 1965 and became a four-year college in 1976. The school is also known locally as Meion (名音). It is sister school of Doho University.

External links
 Official website 

Educational institutions established in 1965
Private universities and colleges in Japan
Universities and colleges in Nagoya
Music schools in Japan
1965 establishments in Japan